Zonampanel (INN, code name YM872) is a quinoxalinedione derivative drug and competitive antagonist of the AMPA receptor which was being investigated by Yamanouchi/Astellas Pharma as a neuroprotective drug for the treatment of ischemic stroke but never completed clinical trials. In clinical trials, zonampanel produced severe side effects including hallucinations, agitation, and catatonia in patients, resulting in early termination of the trials.

References

AMPA receptor antagonists
Imidazoles
Neuroprotective agents
Nitro compounds
Quinoxalines
Astellas Pharma
Acetic acids